Svetozar Šapurić (born 28 August 1960) is a Serbian football manager and former player.

Career
Šapurić started out at his hometown club Vrbas, spending eight seasons in the senior squad (1977–1985), before securing a move to Vojvodina. He was a member of the team that won the Yugoslav First League in 1989. Subsequently, Šapurić moved abroad to Cyprus and signed with APOEL. He later switched to Anorthosis (1993–1995), before returning to APOEL for his final season.

After finishing his playing career, Šapurić was briefly manager of APOEL in 1996. He later served as sporting director for his former club Vojvodina from September 1996 to October 1999. Afterwards, Šapurić returned to Cyprus for his second brief spell as manager of APOEL in 2000. He also later appointed as their sporting director in December 2015, remaining in charge until September 2018.

Honours

Player
Vojvodina
 Yugoslav First League: 1988–89
APOEL
 Cypriot First Division: 1989–90, 1991–92, 1995–96
 Cypriot Cup: 1992–93, 1995–96
 Cypriot Super Cup: 1992
Anorthosis
 Cypriot First Division: 1994–95

Manager
Ethnikos Achna
 UEFA Intertoto Cup: 2006

References

External links
 
 

Association football midfielders
Anorthosis Famagusta F.C. players
APOEL FC managers
APOEL FC players
Apollon Limassol FC managers
Changchun Yatai F.C. managers
Chinese Super League managers
Cypriot First Division players
Cypriot people of Serbian descent
Ethnikos Achna FC managers
Cangzhou Mighty Lions F.C. managers
Expatriate football managers in China
Expatriate footballers in Cyprus
FK Vojvodina players
FK Vrbas players
Olympiakos Nicosia managers
People from Vrbas, Serbia
Serbian expatriate football managers
Serbian expatriate sportspeople in China
Serbian football managers
Serbian footballers
Yugoslav expatriate footballers
Yugoslav First League players
Yugoslav footballers
1960 births
Living people